Anna Vladimirovna Blinkova (born 10 September 1998) is a Russian professional tennis player. In February 2020, she reached her best singles ranking of world No. 54. On 14 September 2020, she peaked at No. 45 in the WTA doubles rankings.
She has won one singles and one doubles title on the WTA Tour, one singles and one doubles title each on WTA Challenger Tour as well as three singles and ten doubles titles on the ITF Circuit.

Blinkova was runner-up at the 2015 Wimbledon Championships in girls' singles and was ranked the No. 3 junior tennis player in the world in August 2015.

Personal life and background
Anna Blinkova was born on 10 September 1998 in Moscow to mother Elena and father Vladimir. During childhood, she played both tennis and chess to a high level. She prefers playing on hardcourts. Her favourite shot is forehand. She speaks Russian, Slovak, French and English.

Junior career
Blinkova is former junior world No. 3 player. She was runner-up at the 2015 Wimbledon in girls' singles, where she lost to compatriot Sofya Zhuk.

Professional career

2015–17: First steps

Blinkova made her debut at the ITF Circuit at the $10K event in Kantaoui in February 2015. There she won her first ITF doubles title. In January 2016, she won her first ITF singles title at the $10K Stuttgart. In April 2016, she turned pro and made her WTA Tour debut at the Morocco Open, where she was defeated in the first round. In October 2016, she won her first match on the WTA Tour, defeating Anastasija Sevastova in the first round of Kremlin Cup.

In January 2017, she made Grand Slam debut at the Australian Open through qualifying, where she defeated Monica Niculescu in the first round before losing to Karolína Plíšková in the second. At the 2017 Wimbledon and US Open, she also reached main draw, but then lost to Elena Vesnina in the first round of both competition. During the 2017 season, she won two $100K events on the ITF Circuit in doubles event, in Ilkley and St. Petersburg.

2018–19: Top-100 debut in singles and doubles

In February 2018, she reached the third round of the Premier 5 Qatar Open, defeating Elena Vesnina and Kristina Mladenovic, before she lost to world No. 7, Caroline Garcia. In May, she won her first WTA doubles title at the Morocco Open, partnering with Raluca Olaru. Blinkova entered top 100 for the first time in both singles and doubles in 2018. 

At the 2019 French Open, she reached third round after the major win over Caroline Garcia, but then lost to Madison Keys.

In August 2019, she reached her first WTA Tour quarterfinal in singles at the Bronx Open, where she lost to Wang Qiang. 
At the 2019 US Open, she took defending champion and top seed Naomi Osaka to three sets. 
She followed this with title in New Haven on the WTA Challenger Tour. Nearly after that, she reached the semifinal of the Guangzhou Open, but then lost to Sofia Kenin. In October, she reached another semifinal at the Luxembourg Open, but lost to later champion Jeļena Ostapenko. During the year, she did even better in doubles. In February 2019, she won the Hua Hin Championships, alongside Wang Yafan. After that, she reached semifinals of the Hungarian Open. In April, she reached another semifinal at the Premier-level Stuttgart Open. She then won $60K, $80K and $100K events, respectively, on the ITF Circuit. In September, she won the WTA Challenger New Haven.

2020: US Open doubles semifinal, first top-10 win
Blinkova continued to made better results in doubles than singles. Despite not producing good results in singles during the season, Blinkova started year with her first career top 10 win, defeating Belinda Bencic in the first round of the Shenzhen Open. In singles, her best result of the year came at the Italian Open, where she reached the third round, but then lost to world No. 4, Karolína Plíšková. In doubles, her first significant result came in March at the Indian Wells Challenger, where she reached the semifinal. Then, six month absence of the WTA Tour happened due to COVID-19 pandemic outbreak.

When tennis came back in August, she first played at the Top Seed Open, where she reached the semifinal in doubles alongside Vera Zvonareva. She followed this with quarterfinal of the Cincinnati Open, alongside Veronika Kudermetova. Things then went even better at the US Open, where Blinkova and Kudermetova reached the semifinal. They lost to eventual champions Laura Siegemund and Vera Zvonareva. In singles, she lost to eventual semifinalist Jennifer Brady in the first round.

Blinkova qualified for the main draw at the Internazionali d'Italia and defeated Aliona Bolsova in a final-set tiebreak to reach the third round.

2021: Out of top 100

Blinkova started her year with consecutive losses at the Grampians Trophy and the Australian Open, before clinching her first win of the year over former top-ten player Andrea Petkovic in the first round of the Phillip Island Trophy. However, she managed to reach the doubles semifinals of the Gippsland Trophy with Veronika Kudermetova, but lost to Chan Hao-ching/Latisha Chan 9-11 in the match tiebreak. Alongside compatriot Anastasia Potapova, she reached her third WTA doubles final at the Phillip Island Trophy, losing to Ankita Raina and Kamilla Rakhimova.

She reached her first semifinal of the year at the Bol Ladies Open, a WTA 125 event, as the top seed. However, she lost to Jasmine Paolini, after winning just four games.

At the Wimbledon Championships, Blinkova beat Tímea Babos in the first round before falling to world No. 1, Ashleigh Barty, on Centre Court.

Blinkova reached the doubles semifinals of the Western & Southern Open with Aliaksandra Sasnovich, defeating top seeds Hsieh Su-wei/Elise Mertens in the second round. She lost in the first round of the US Open to Valentini Grammatikopoulou.

2022: Resurgence, first WTA title, back to top 100
After falling in the opening round of qualifying at the Australian Open to You Xiaodi, Blinkova reached her first singles final since 2019 at the $60k event Open Andrézieux-Bouthéon 42, defeating Océane Dodin for her first top-100 win since August 2021, before losing to Ana Bogdan in the final.

The Russian followed it up with another $60k final at the Open de l'Isère, where she beat the top seed Arantxa Rus before she lost to Katie Boulter in the final.

She won her first WTA Tour-level singles title at the 2022 Transylvania Open.

Performance timelines

Only main-draw results in WTA Tour, Grand Slam tournaments, Fed Cup /Billie Jean King Cup and Olympic Games are included in win–loss records.

Singles
Current after the 2023 Indian Wells Open.

Doubles
Current after the 2023 Australian Open.

WTA career finals

Singles: 1 (1 title)

Doubles: 4 (1 title, 3 runner-ups)

WTA Challenger finals

Singles: 2 (1 title, 1 runner-up)

Doubles: 1 (title)

ITF Circuit finals

Singles: 9 (3 titles, 6 runner–ups)

Doubles: 11 (11 titles)

Junior Grand Slam tournament finals

Girls' singles: 1 (runner–up)

Fed Cup participation

Singles (0–1)

Doubles (2–0)

WTA Tour career earnings
Correct as of 15 November 2021

Wins over top-10 players

Notes

References

External links
 
 
 

1998 births
Living people
Tennis players from Moscow
Russian female tennis players